The Amir Nezām House (Persian: خانه امیرنظام, Khaneh-e Amir Nezām, Azeri: Emir Nizamin evi), or The Qajar Museum of Tabriz, is a historical building in the Sheshghelan district (Persian: ششگلان), one of the oldest quarters of the city of Tabriz, Iran. The base of the edifice covers an area of 1200 square metres. This monument which since 2006 houses a museum dedicated to the Qajar dynasty (1781-1925), was built in the period of the Crown Prince Abbas Mirza (1789-1833). It was renovated by Hasan-Ali Khan (حسنعلی خان), Hasan Ali Khan Garroosy, in his position as the Major-domo of Azarbaijan, and used as his residency. In the subsequent periods, the house was employed as the official residence of the provincial governors of Azarbaijan. Because of persistent neglect over a long period of time, this building had come to be in such a bad state of disrepair that for a time it was seriously considered to demolish it and build a school in its place. Between 1993-2006 it has been subject of an extensive renovation process and since the completion of this undertaking it has been granted the National Heritage status.

The Sheshghelan district has been Governor's seat during the Ilkhanate dynasty.
Hasan-Ali Khan, Amir Nezām Garousi, was born in 1820 in Bijar, in the Kurdistan Province. For a period of twenty-two years he served in various governmental positions. In particular, for a period he was in charge of the Iranian students sent to Europe by the government of Iran. He also served as the General of the Garrus Army and Head of the Security Guards of the High Court and of Arg-e Tabriz. He is buried in Mahan, in the Kerman Province. He is best remembered for his exemplary prose in the Persian language.

See also 
 Behnam House
 Constitutional Revolution House of Tabriz
 Haidarzadeh house
 House of Seghat ol Islam

References 
 The Amir Nezām House (East Azarbaijan Cultural Heritage Handycraft And Tourism Organization). 
 eachto.ir
 Firouz Malek-Madani, PhD, Hassan-Ali Khan Garrousi, Amir Nezām, Rozaneh Magazine, January–February 2006: (Outline, Article. Part I).

External links

 Virtual Museum of Historical Buildings of Tabriz (School of Architecture, Tabriz Islamic Art University).
  Tabriz Islamic Art University (دانشگاه هنر اسلامی تبریز), Tabriz, Iran
  Picture gallery, Tabriz Islamic Art University (دانشگاه هنر اسلامی تبریز), Tabriz, Iran
 Iranian Student's Tourism & Traveling Agency, ISTTA. (English), (Persian)

Museums in Tabriz
Houses in Iran
Architecture in Iran
Buildings and structures in Tabriz
Buildings of the Qajar period